Heaney is a crater on Mercury. Its name was adopted by the International Astronomical Union (IAU) on March 20, 2017. Heaney is named for the Irish poet and playwright Seamus Heaney.

At the west rim of Heaney is a dark spot of low reflectance material (LRM), closely associated with hollows.  The region along the south rim is also fairly dark.

To the northwest of Heaney is Amaral crater, and to the southwest is Beckett.

References

Impact craters on Mercury